Mary Mack is a Scottish folk song, and is also a patter song, often sung not only with a rapid to very rapid tempo but increasing toward the end.

Recordings

The definitive version of Mary Mack is, perhaps, the live version on the 1977 double album "Makem & Clancy Concert," performed live at National Stadium Dublin by the late great Irish troubadours, Tommy Makem and Liam Clancy. "Mary Mac" has long been a fixture of Richmond, Virginia band Carbon Leaf's live sets.  A studio recording appears on their 2001 album Echo Echo and a live recording on their 2003 album 5 Alive!. Another recording was done by Great Big Sea on their 1995 album Up, which is well-known throughout Canada. Another recording was done by Fiddler's Green (band) on their 1998 album Spin Around, which was recorded in Los Angeles.

Lyrics
There's a nice wee lass an her name is Mary Mack
Mak nae mistake, she's the miss I'm gaun tae tak
There's a lot o ither chaps wha would get up on her track
But I'm thinkin they'll hae tae get up early.

Chorus:
Mary Mack's faither's makin Mary Mack mairy me
My faither's makin me mairy Mary Mack
An I'm gaun tae mairy Mary tae get mairrit an tak care o me
We'll aw be makin merry when I mairy Mary Mack

Chorus

This wee lass she haes a lot of brass
She haes a lot of gas, her faither thinks I'm class
An I'd be a silly ass tae let the matter pass
For her faither thinks she suits me fairly.

Chorus

Noo Mary an her mither gang an awful lot thegither
In fact you niver see the wan, or the wan withoot the ither
An the fellows often wonder if its Mary or her mither
Or the baith o them thegether that I'm courtin.

Chorus

Noo the weddin day's on Wednesday an everythin's arranged
Her name will soon be changed tae mine, unless her mind be changed
An we're makin the arrangements, faith, I'm just aboot deranged
For mairriage is an awfu undertakin.

Chorus

It's sure tae be a grand affair an grander than a fair
A coach an pair for rich an poor an every pair that's there
We'll dine upon the finest fare, I'm sure tae get ma share
If I don't we'll aw be very much mistaken.

Chorus

There are many renditions of this song: Here are the lyrics to another version, with mother instead of father in the chorus:

Chorus

Mary Mack's mother's making Mary Mack marry me,
My mother's making me marry Mary Mack.
I'm gonna marry Mary so my Mary will take care O' me,
We'll all be feeling merry when I marry Mary Mack.

Now there's a nice wee lass and her name is Mary Mack,
Make no mistake she's the girl I gonna take,
And a lot of other fella's would get upon her track,
but I'm thinkin' they'll have to get up early.

Chorus

Now this wee lass she has a lot of cash,
She has a lot of brass...her father thinks I'm gas,
I'd be a silly ass to let the matter pass,
Her father thinks she suits me very fairly.

Chorus

Now Mary and her mother gang an awful lot together,
In fact you hardly ever see the one without the other,
And all the fella's wonder is it Mary or her mother,
Or both of them together that I'm courtin'.

Chorus

Now the weddin' day 's on Wednesday and everything's arranged,
Her name will soon be changed to mine unless her mind be changed,  
I'm making the arrangements I'm just about derranged
For marriage is an awful undertaking

Chorus

External links
 Lyrics

Scottish folk songs
Songs about marriage
Great Big Sea songs